Audel Josiah O'Neil Laville (born 14 September 2002) is a Dominican professional footballer who plays as a midfielder for the Dominica national team.

Career
He started his youth career to the Dominica U-20 team on 6 November 2018 in the 2018 CONCACAF U-20 Championship held in the United States, in a 2–1 victory against non-FIFA member Martinique.

Two weeks after the tournament, on 20 November, he made his senior debut in the CONCACAF Nations League qualifying against non-FIFA member, Sint Maarten in a 0–2 victory.

On 18 November 2019, Laville scored his first goal for Dominica against St. Vincent and the Grenadines in a 1–0 victory in the CONCACAF Nations League. However, CONCACAF confirmed that Dominica was relegated before the final game, and Dominica was relegated to League C.

International career

International goals
Scores and results Dominica's goal tally first.

References

2002 births
Living people
Dominica footballers
Association football midfielders
Dominica youth international footballers
Dominica international footballers